Rajkot South is one of the 182 Legislative Assembly constituencies of Gujarat state in India. It is part of Rajkot district and it came into existence after 2008 delimitation.

List of segments
This assembly seat represents the following segments

 Rajkot Taluka (Part) – Rajkot Municipal Corporation (Part) Ward No. – 1, 2, 3, 4, 6, 7, 8, 9, 10.

Member of Legislative Assembly

Election results

2022

2017

2012

See also
 List of constituencies of Gujarat Legislative Assembly
 Gujarat Legislative Assembly

References

External links
 

Assembly constituencies of Gujarat
Rajkot district